The embassy of Peru in Cuba represents the permanent diplomatic mission of the South American country in Cuba.

The current Peruvian ambassador to Cuba is Gonzalo Flavio Guillén Beker.

History
Peru and Cuba established relations in 1902. After the Cuban Revolution, relations continued, but their troubled nature led to Peru to sever diplomatic relationships on December 30, 1960, leading to the closure of the Peruvian embassy. After the establishment of Juan Velasco Alvarado's Revolutionary Government, Peru reestablished its relations with Cuba on 8 July 1972, which have remained since.

1980 crisis

On early 1980, a small group of Cuban citizens made their way into the embassy, instigating an international crisis over the diplomatic status of around 10,000 asylum-seeking Cubans who joined them over the following days after the Cuban government ceased its protection of the embassy.

See also
Cuba–Peru relations
List of ambassadors of Peru to Cuba

References

Peru
Havana
Cuba–Peru relations